Assin North() 11:19, 25 November 2021 (UTC) is one of the constituencies represented in the Parliament of Ghana. It elects one Member of Parliament (MP) by the first past the post system of election. The Assin North constituency is located in the Assin North district of the Central Region of Ghana.

Boundaries
The seat is located entirely within the Assin North Municipality of the Central Region of Ghana.

Members of Parliament

Elections
Ken Ohene Agyapong, the MP for the Assin North constituency from the 2000 parliamentary election to the 2008 parliamentary election became the MP for Assin Central constituency in 2012.

See also
List of Ghana Parliament constituencies
Assin North District

References 

Parliamentary constituencies in the Central Region (Ghana)